Posts may refer to:
 Post (disambiguation)
 Posts, California